Giad, more formally Giad Industrial City, is an industrial city located 50 miles south of Khartoum in Sudan. It is owned and operated by the GIAD Industrial Group.
The Group was established in 1993.

See also
 Planned city

Giad website

Populated places in Khartoum (state)